Guiding Star or guiding star may refer to:

Guiding Star (play), a 1998 play by Jonathan Harvey (playwright)
"Guiding Star" (song), a single by the British group Cast
, an American troopship in service 1944-73
Guiding Star (2007 album) by Vusi Mahlasela.
Guiding Star Grange, a Grange Hall building in Greenfield, Massachusetts, United States
Guiding Stars, a nutrient density rating system

Guide star may refer to:
Guide star, a reference star used to accurately maintain the tracking by a telescope of a heavenly body
GuideStar, an information website reporting on U.S. nonprofit companies

See also
Lodestar (disambiguation)
Cynosure